Brigadier W.A.A.P. Bhathiya Jayatilleka, RSP was a Sri Lankan Army officer, who was the Brigade commander, 54-1 brigade of the 54 Division based at Elephant Pass.

Educated at Royal College, Colombo, Jayatilleka joined the army after completing his schooling and was commissioned as a Second Lieutenant in the Sri Lanka Artillery, following his training at the Sri Lanka Military Academy.

He was severing as the Brigade commander 54-1 brigade of the 54 Division based at Elephant Pass at the out set of the Second Battle of Elephant Pass in 2000. Following orders from the GOC 54 Division to make a strategic withdrawal of troops from Elephant Pass due to a lack of water, Colonel Jayatilleka withdrew his troops in order. He died of dehydration on April 22, 2000, at the Palali Military Hospital. He was promoted to the rank of Brigadier posthumously.

Brigadier Jayatilleka had received the Rana Sura Padakkama (RSP),  the Sri Lanka Armed Services Long Service Medal, the Riviresa Campaign Services Medal and the North and East Operations Medal.

Jayatilleka was married to the daughter of the former army commander General Hamilton Wanasinghe. His brother Captain Nalin Jayatilleke was killed in 1993 serving as a forward observation officer.

References

External links
Troops capture Elephant Pass:Road to Jaffna open 
Major shuffle in the army hierarchy

Sri Lanka Artillery officers
Year of birth missing
Alumni of Royal College, Colombo
2000 deaths
Sri Lanka Military Academy graduates
Sri Lankan military personnel killed in action
Sinhalese military personnel
Sri Lankan brigadiers
Deaths by dehydration